Yato Rocks is the group of rocks lying in an aquatory of 25 ha that extends 780 m in west–east direction and 560 m in south–north direction in the Wauwermans Islands group of Wilhelm Archipelago in the Antarctic Peninsula region. Their surface area is 25 ha.

The feature is so named because of its shape supposedly resembling a flock of birds in flight, 'yato' being the Bulgarian for 'bird flock', and in association with other descriptive names of islands in the area.

Location
British mapping in 2001.

Maps
 British Admiralty Nautical Chart 446 Anvers Island to Renaud Island. Scale 1:150000. Admiralty, UK Hydrographic Office, 2001
 Brabant Island to Argentine Islands. Scale 1:250000 topographic map. British Antarctic Survey, 2008
 Antarctic Digital Database (ADD). Scale 1:250000 topographic map of Antarctica. Scientific Committee on Antarctic Research (SCAR). Since 1993, regularly upgraded and updated

See also
 List of Antarctic and subantarctic islands

Notes

References
 Yato Rocks. SCAR Composite Gazetteer of Antarctica
 Bulgarian Antarctic Gazetteer. Antarctic Place-names Commission. (details in Bulgarian, basic data in English)

External links
 Yato Rocks. Adjusted Copernix satellite image

Islands of the Wilhelm Archipelago
Bulgaria and the Antarctic